Nationlink may refer to:

Nationlink (interbank network), an interbank network in the Philippines
NationLink Telecom, a telecommunications operator in Somalia and the Middle East